Yersinia is a genus of bacteria in the family Yersiniaceae. Yersinia species are Gram-negative, coccobacilli bacteria, a few micrometers long and fractions of a micrometer in diameter, and are facultative anaerobes. Some members of Yersinia are pathogenic in humans; in particular, Y. pestis is the causative agent of the plague. Rodents are the natural reservoirs of Yersinia; less frequently, other mammals serve as the host. Infection may occur either through blood (in the case of Y. pestis) or in an alimentary fashion, occasionally via consumption of food products (especially vegetables, milk-derived products, and meat) contaminated with infected urine or feces.

Speculations exist as to whether or not certain Yersinia can also be spread by  protozoonotic mechanisms, since Yersinia species are known to be facultative intracellular parasites; studies and discussions of the possibility of amoeba-vectored (through the cyst form of the protozoan) Yersinia propagation and proliferation are now in progress.

Microbial physiology
An interesting feature peculiar to some of the Yersinia bacteria is the ability to not only survive, but also to actively proliferate at temperatures as low as 1–4 °C (e.g., on cut salads and other food products in a refrigerator). Yersinia bacteria are relatively quickly inactivated by oxidizing agents such as hydrogen peroxide and potassium permanganate solutions.

Genetics

Database
The creation of YersiniaBase, a data and tools collection for the reporting and comparison of Yersinia species genome sequence data, was reported in January 2015.  The provisional representation of species addressed by the resource has been indicated in the TaxBox on this page by a superscript 'yb' beside the species name.  Development of YersiniaBase was funded by the University of Malaya and the Ministry of Education, Malaysia.

Pathogenesis
Y. pestis is the causative agent of plague. The disease caused by Y. enterocolitica is called yersiniosis.

Yersinia may be associated with Crohn's disease, an inflammatory autoimmune condition of the gut. Iranian sufferers of Crohn's disease were more likely to have had earlier exposure to refrigerators at home, consistent with its unusual ability to thrive at low temperatures.

Yersinia is implicated as one of the causes of reactive arthritis worldwide.

Also, the genus is associated with pseudoappendicitis, which is an incorrect diagnosis of appendicitis due to a similar presentation.

History

Y. pestis, the first known species, was identified in 1894 by A.E.J. Yersin, a Swiss bacteriologist, and Kitasato Shibasaburō, a Japanese bacteriologist. It was formerly described as Pasteurella pestis (known trivially as the plague-bacillus) by Lehmann and Neumann in 1896. In 1944, van Loghem reclassified the species P. pestis and P. rondentium into a new genus, Yersinia. Following the introduction of the bacteriological code, it was accepted as valid in 1980.

References

External links
Yersinia Enterocolitis Mimicking Crohn's Disease in a Toddler
Sweden: Pork warnings over new stomach illness
 Yersinia genomes and related information at   PATRIC, a Bioinformatics Resource Center funded by   NIAID
 

 
Bacteria genera